Jascha Heifetz (December 10, 1987) was a Jewish-Lithuanian born American violinist. Born in Vilnius, he moved to the United States as a teenager, where his Carnegie Hall debut was rapturously received. He was a virtuoso from childhood. Fritz Kreisler, another leading violinist of the twentieth century, said after hearing Heifetz's debut, "We might as well take our fiddles and break them across our knees." He had a long and successful performing career; however, after an injury to his right (bowing) arm, he switched his focus to teaching.

Late in life, Heifetz was known as a dedicated teacher and a champion of socio-political causes. He publicly advocated to establish 9-1-1 as an emergency phone number, and crusaded for clean air. He and his students at the University of Southern California protested smog by wearing gas masks, and in 1967, he converted his Renault passenger car into an electric vehicle.

Early life 
Heifetz was born into a Lithuanian-Jewish family in Vilnius (temporarily occupied by Russian Empire, now in Lithuania).
 
His father, Reuven Heifetz, was a local violin teacher and served as the concertmaster of the Vilnius Theatre Orchestra for one season before the theatre closed down. While Jascha was an infant, his father did a series of tests, observing how his son responded to his violin playing. This convinced him that Jascha had great potential, and before Jascha was two years old, his father bought him a small violin, and taught him bowing and simple fingering.

At four years old, he started lessons with Elias Malkin. He was a child prodigy, making his public debut at seven, in Kovno (now Kaunas, Lithuania) playing the Violin Concerto in E minor by Felix Mendelssohn. In 1910, he entered the Saint Petersburg Conservatory to study under Ovanes Nalbandian and later under Leopold Auer.

He played in Germany and Scandinavia, and met Fritz Kreisler for the first time in a Berlin private house, in a "private press matinee on May 20, 1912. The home was that of Arthur Abell, the pre-eminent Berlin music critic for the American magazine, Musical Courier. Among other noted violinists in attendance was Fritz Kreisler. After the 12-year-old Heifetz performed the Mendelssohn violin concerto, Abell reported that Kreisler said to all present, 'We may as well break our fiddles across our knees.'"

Heifetz visited much of Europe while still in his teens. In April 1911, he performed in an outdoor concert in St. Petersburg before 25,000 spectators; there was such a reaction that police officers needed to protect the young violinist after the concert. In 1914, he performed with the Berlin Philharmonic conducted by Arthur Nikisch. The conductor said he had never heard such an excellent violinist.

Career 

Heifetz and his family left Russia in 1917, traveling by rail to the Russian far east and then by ship to the United States, arriving in San Francisco. On October 27, 1917, Heifetz played for the first time in the United States, at Carnegie Hall in New York, and became an immediate sensation.
Fellow violinist Mischa Elman in the audience asked "Do you think it's hot in here?", whereupon the pianist Leopold Godowsky, in the next seat, replied, "Not for pianists."

In 1917, Heifetz was elected an honorary member of Phi Mu Alpha Sinfonia, the national fraternity for men in music, by the fraternity's Alpha chapter at the New England Conservatory of Music in Boston. At 16, he was perhaps the youngest person ever elected to membership in the organization. Heifetz remained in the country and became an American citizen in 1925. A story circulates that tells of an interaction with one of the Marx Brothers: when he told the brother (usually Groucho or Harpo) that he had been earning his living as a musician since the age of seven, he received the reply, "Before that, I suppose, you were just a bum."

In 1954, Heifetz began working with pianist Brooks Smith, who was Heifetz's accompanist for many years until he changed to Ayke Agus as his accompanist in retirement. He was also accompanied in concert for more than 20 years by Emanuel Bay, another immigrant from Russia and a personal friend. Heifetz's musicianship was such that he would demonstrate to his accompanist how he wanted passages to sound on the piano, and would even suggest which fingerings to use.

After the seasons of 1955–56, Heifetz announced that he would sharply curtail his concert activity, saying "I have been playing for a very long time." In 1958, he tripped in his kitchen and fractured his right hip, resulting in hospitalization at Cedars of Lebanon Hospital and a near fatal staphylococcus infection. He was invited to play Beethoven at the United Nations General Assembly, and entered leaning on a cane. By 1967, Heifetz had considerably curtailed his concert performances.

Technique and timbre 
Heifetz was "regarded as the greatest violin virtuoso since Paganini", wrote Lois Timnick of the Los Angeles Times. "He set all standards for 20th-century violin playing...everything about him conspired to create a sense of awe", wrote music critic Harold Schonberg of The New York Times. "The goals he set still remain, and for violinists today it's rather depressing that they may never really be attained again", wrote violinist Itzhak Perlman.

Virgil Thomson called Heifetz's style of playing "silk underwear music", a term he did not intend as a compliment. Other critics argue that he infused his playing with feeling and reverence for the composer's intentions. His style of playing was highly influential in defining the way modern violinists approached the instrument. His use of rapid vibrato, emotionally charged portamento, fast tempi, and superb bow control coalesced to create a highly distinctive sound that makes Heifetz's playing instantly recognizable to aficionados. Itzhak Perlman, who himself is known for his rich warm tone and expressive use of portamento, described Heifetz's tone as like "a tornado" because of its emotional intensity. Perlman said that Heifetz preferred to record relatively close to the microphone—and as a result, one would perceive a somewhat different tone quality when listening to Heifetz during a concert hall performance.

Heifetz was very particular about his choice of strings. He used a silver-wound Tricolore gut G string, plain unvarnished gut D and A strings, and a Goldbrokat medium steel E string, and employed clear Hill-brand rosin sparingly. Heifetz believed that playing on gut strings was important in rendering an individual sound.

Early recordings 
Heifetz made his first recordings in Russia during 1910–11, while still a student of Leopold Auer. The existence of these recordings was not generally known until after Heifetz's death, when several sides, including François Schubert's L'Abeille, were reissued on an LP included as a supplement to The Strad magazine.

Shortly after his Carnegie Hall debut on November 7, 1917, Heifetz made his first recordings for the Victor Talking Machine Company/RCA Victor where he remained for most of the rest of his career. On October 28, 1927, Heifetz was the starring act at the grand opening of Tucson, Arizona's now-historic Temple of Music and Art. For several years, in the 1930s, Heifetz recorded primarily for HMV/EMI in the UK because RCA Victor cut back on expensive classical recording sessions during the Great Depression; these HMV discs were issued in the United States by RCA Victor. Heifetz often enjoyed playing chamber music. Various critics have blamed his limited success in chamber ensembles to the fact that his artistic personality tended to overwhelm his colleagues. Collaborations include his 1941 recordings of piano trios by Beethoven, Schubert, and Brahms with cellist Emanuel Feuermann and pianist Arthur Rubinstein as well as a later collaboration with Rubinstein and cellist Gregor Piatigorsky, with whom he recorded trios by Maurice Ravel, Tchaikovsky, and Felix Mendelssohn. Both formations were sometimes referred to as the Million Dollar Trio. Heifetz also recorded some string quintets with violinist Israel Baker, violists William Primrose and Virginia Majewski, and Piatigorsky.

Heifetz recorded the Beethoven Violin Concerto in 1940 with the NBC Symphony Orchestra conducted by Arturo Toscanini, and again in stereo in 1955 with the Boston Symphony Orchestra conducted by Charles Munch. A live performance of an NBC radio broadcast from April 9, 1944, of Heifetz playing the Mendelssohn Violin Concerto with Toscanini and the NBC Symphony has also been released, unofficially.

He performed and recorded Erich Wolfgang Korngold's Violin Concerto at a time when Korngold's scoring of films for Warner Bros. prompted many classical musicians to develop the opinion Korngold was not a "serious" composer and to avoid his music in order to avoid being associated with him.

World War II 

During the war, Heifetz commissioned a number of pieces, including the Violin Concerto by William Walton. He also arranged a number of pieces, such as Hora Staccato by Grigoraș Dinicu, a Romanian whom Heifetz is rumoured to have called the greatest violinist he had ever heard. Heifetz also played and composed for the piano. He performed mess hall jazz for soldiers at Allied camps across Europe during the Second World War, and under the alias Jim Hoyl he wrote a hit song, "When You Make Love to Me (Don't Make Believe)", which was sung by Bing Crosby.

Decca recordings 

From 1944 to 1946, largely as a result of the American Federation of Musicians recording ban (which began in 1942), Heifetz recorded with American Decca because the company settled with the union in 1943, well before RCA Victor resolved their dispute with the musicians. He recorded primarily short pieces, including his own arrangements of music by George Gershwin and Stephen Foster; these were pieces he often played as encores in his recitals. He was accompanied on the piano by Emanuel Bay or Milton Kaye. Among the more uncommon discs featured one of Decca's popular artists, Bing Crosby, in the "Lullaby" from Benjamin Godard's opera Jocelyn and Where My Caravan Has Rested (arranged by Heifetz and Crosby) by Hermann Löhr (1871–1943); Decca's studio orchestra was conducted by Victor Young on July 27, 1946, session. Heifetz soon returned to RCA Victor, where he continued to make recordings until the early 1970s.

Later recordings 

Returning to RCA Victor in 1946, Heifetz continued to record extensively for the company, including solo, chamber, and concerto recordings, primarily with the Boston Symphony Orchestra under Charles Munch and the Chicago Symphony Orchestra under Fritz Reiner.
In 2000, RCA released a double CD compilation entitled Jascha Heifetz – The Supreme. This release provides a sampling of Heifetz's major recordings, including the 1955 recording of Brahms's Violin Concerto with Reiner and the Chicago Symphony Orchestra; the 1957 recording of Tchaikovsky's Violin Concerto (with the same forces); the 1959 recording of Sibelius's Violin Concerto with Walter Hendl and the Chicago Symphony Orchestra; the 1961 recording of Max Bruch's Scottish Fantasy with Sir Malcolm Sargent and the New Symphony Orchestra of London; the 1963 recording of Glazunov's A minor Concerto with Walter Hendl and the RCA Victor Symphony Orchestra (drawn from New York musicians); the 1965 recording of George Gershwin's Three Preludes (transcribed by Heifetz) with pianist Brooks Smith; and the 1970 recording of Bach's unaccompanied Chaconne from the Partita No. 2 in D minor.

Third Israel tour 

On his third tour to Israel in 1953, Heifetz included the Violin Sonata by Richard Strauss in his recitals. At the time, many considered Strauss and a number of other German intellectuals Nazis, or at least Nazi sympathizers, and Strauss works were unofficially banned in Israel along with those of Richard Wagner. Despite the fact that the Holocaust had occurred less than ten years earlier and a last-minute plea from the Israeli Minister of Education, the defiant Heifetz argued, "The music is above these factors … I will not change my program. I have the right to decide on my repertoire." Throughout his tour the performance of the Strauss sonata was followed by dead silence.

Heifetz was attacked after his recital in Jerusalem outside his hotel by a young man who struck Heifetz's violin case with a crowbar, prompting Heifetz to use his bow-controlling right hand to protect his priceless violins. The attacker escaped and was never found. The attack has since been attributed to the Kingdom of Israel militant group. The incident made headlines and Heifetz defiantly announced that he would not stop playing the Strauss. Threats continued to come, however, and he omitted the Strauss from his next recital without explanation. His last concert was cancelled after his swollen right hand began to hurt. He left Israel and did not return until 1970.

Emigration to the U.S. 
The Soviet establishment considered Heifetz and his teacher Leopold Auer traitors to their home country for emigrating to the US. Meanwhile, musicians who remained, such as David Oistrakh, were seen as patriots. Heifetz greatly criticized the Soviet regime, and condemned the International Tchaikovsky Competition for bias against Western competitors. During the Carl Flesch Competition in London, Oistrakh tried to persuade Erick Friedman, Heifetz's star student, to enter the Tchaikovsky Competition, of which he was the principal juror. Hearing of this, Heifetz strongly advised against it, warning Friedman, "You will see what will happen there."

Consequently, the competition received international outrage after Friedman, already a seasoned performer and RCA Victor recording artist, who had performed with the Chicago Symphony Orchestra, London Symphony Orchestra, and the Boston Symphony Orchestra, among many others, was placed sixth behind players who had yet to establish themselves. Joseph Szigeti later informed Heifetz himself that he had given Friedman top scores.

Later life 
After an only partially successful operation on his right shoulder in 1972, Heifetz ceased giving concerts and making records. His prowess as a performer remained, and he still played privately until the end—but his bow arm was affected, and he could never again hold the bow as high as before.

Heifetz taught the violin extensively, holding master classes first at UCLA, then at the University of Southern California, where the faculty included renowned cellist Gregor Piatigorsky and violist William Primrose. For a few years in the 1980s, he also held classes in his private studio at home in Beverly Hills. His teaching studio can be seen today in the main building of the Colburn School and serves as an inspiration to the students there. During his teaching career Heifetz taught, among others, Erick Friedman, Pierre Amoyal, Adam Han-Gorski, Rudolf Koelman, Endre Granat, Teiji Okubo, Eugene Fodor, Paul Rosenthal, Ilkka Talvi and Ayke Agus.

Death 

Heifetz died at Cedars-Sinai Medical Center in Los Angeles, California, on December 10, 1987, at the age of 86 following a fall in his home.

Legacy 
Heifetz owned the 1714 Dolphin Stradivarius, the 1731 "Piel" Stradivarius, the 1736 Carlo Tononi, and the 1742 ex David Guarneri del Gesù, the last of which he preferred and kept until his death. The Dolphin Strad is currently owned by the Nippon Music Foundation and is on loan to Ray Chen. The Heifetz Tononi violin, used at his 1917 Carnegie Hall debut, was left in his will to Sherry Kloss, his Master-Teaching Assistant, with "one of my four good bows". Violinist Kloss wrote Jascha Heifetz Through My Eyes, and is a co-founder of the Jascha Heifetz Society.

The famed Guarneri is now in the San Francisco Legion of Honor Museum, as instructed by Heifetz in his will, and may only be taken out and played "on special occasions" by deserving players. The instrument has recently been on loan to San Francisco Symphony's concertmaster Alexander Barantschik, who featured it in 2006 with Andrei Gorbatenko and the San Francisco Academy Orchestra in 2006. In 1989, Heifetz received a posthumous Grammy Lifetime Achievement Award.

Family 
Heifetz's son Jay is a professional photographer. He was formerly head of marketing for the Los Angeles Philharmonic and Hollywood Bowl, and the chief financial officer of Paramount Pictures' Worldwide Video Division. He lives and works in Fremantle, Western Australia. Heifetz's daughter, Josefa Heifetz Byrne, is a lexicographer, the author of the Dictionary of Unusual, Obscure and Preposterous Words.

Heifetz's great-niece is famed clarinetist, formerly of the LA Philharmonic, Michele Zukovsky.

Filmography 

Heifetz played a featured role in the movie They Shall Have Music (1939) directed by Archie Mayo and written by John Howard Lawson and Irmgard von Cube. He played himself, stepping in to save a music school for poor children from foreclosure. He later appeared in the film, Carnegie Hall (1947), performing an abridged version of the first movement of Tchaikovsky's Violin Concerto, with the orchestra led by Fritz Reiner, and consoling the star of the picture, who had watched his performance. In 1951, he appeared in the film Of Men and Music. In 1962, he appeared in a televised series of his master classes, and, in 1971, Heifetz on Television aired, an hour-long color special that featured the violinist performing a series of short works, the Scottish Fantasy by Max Bruch, and the Chaconne from the Partita No. 2 by J.S.Bach. Heifetz conducted the orchestra, as the surviving video recording documents.

The most recent film featuring Heifetz, Jascha Heifetz: God's Fiddler, premiered on April 16, 2011, at the Colburn School of Music. It is described as: "The only film biography of the world's most renowned violinist, featuring family home movies in Los Angeles and all over the world. The documentary-like film talks about Heifetz's life and accomplishments and gives an inside view of his personal life."

Notable instruments 

 Dolphin 1714 Stradivarius
 Heifetz-Piel 1731 Stradivarius
 Antonio Stradivari 1734
 Carlo Tononi 1736
 Giovanni Battista Guadagnini, Piacenza 1741
 ex-David 1742 Guarneri

See also 

 Jascha Heifetz Competition

References

Sources 

 Auer, Leopold, 1923, My Long Life in Music, Stokes, New York

External links 

 Jascha Heifetz official website
 Jascha Heifetz at Sony BMG Masterworks
 NPR Classical Music: Heifetz at War: Behind the Scenes, Near the Front
 Jascha Heifetz Collection (ARS.0046), Stanford Archive of Recorded Sound
 Jascha Heifetz recordings at the Discography of American Historical Recordings

1901 births
1987 deaths
20th-century American Jews
American people of Lithuanian-Jewish descent
20th-century American male musicians
20th-century classical violinists
20th-century Russian male musicians
20th-century Russian musicians
American classical violinists
American male violinists
Child classical musicians
Grammy Lifetime Achievement Award winners
Jewish American classical musicians
Jewish classical violinists
Male classical violinists
Musicians from Vilnius
Russian classical violinists
Russian Jews
Saint Petersburg Conservatory alumni
USC Thornton School of Music faculty
Emigrants from the Russian Empire to the United States
20th-century American violinists